The Swordsman is a 1948 American swashbuckler film directed by Joseph H. Lewis and starring Larry Parks, Ellen Drew and George Macready. It was produced and distributed by Columbia Pictures.

Plot
In 18th-century in Scotland, the McArden and Glowan clans stand a violent and long hostility. Alexander, an attractive member of the McArdens clan, falls in love with the beautiful Barbara Glowan. Quickly, their relationship awakens anger of Barbara's cousin, Robert Glowan, who tries to destroy the enemy family forever. The boyfriend, anxious to marry his lover, intends that the two clans live in peace.

Cast
 Larry Parks as Alexander MacArden aka Donald Frazer
 Ellen Drew as Barbara Glowan
 George Macready as Robert Glowan
 Edgar Buchanan as Angus MacArden
 Ray Collins as MacIan, a MacArden
 Marc Platt as Murdoch Glowan
 Michael Duane as Colin Glowan
 Holmes Herbert as Lord Glowan
 Nedrick Young as Bruce Glowan
 Robert Shayne as Ronald MacArden
 Billy Bevan as Old Andrew

Production
The film was based on an original script by Wilfrid Pitit. It was originally called Annie Laurie, then in November 1946, the title was changed to The Forge Man by which time Larry Parks was set to star and Joseph H Lewis was to direct. The same month, Hedda Hopper said the movie's title was Glencoe and that it was filming in secrecy.

Filming finished by March 1947.

Reception
The New York Times called it "a plain old fashioned horse opera" noting many of the situations and dialogue could have come straight from a Western.

References

External links
 
 
 
Review of film at Variety

American swashbuckler films
1948 films
1940s historical adventure films
American historical adventure films
Films set in Scotland
Films set in the 18th century
1940s English-language films
Columbia Pictures films
Films directed by Joseph H. Lewis
Films scored by Hugo Friedhofer
1940s American films